SS Robert Treat Paine was a Liberty ship built in the United States during World War II. She was named after Robert Treat Paine, an American lawyer, politician, and Founding Father best known as a signer of the United States Declaration of Independence as a representative of Massachusetts. He served as the state's first attorney general, and served as an associate justice of the Massachusetts Supreme Judicial Court, the state's highest court.

Construction
Robert Treat Paine was laid down on 6 January 1942, under a Maritime Commission (MARCOM) contract, MCE hull 32, by the Bethlehem-Fairfield Shipyard, Baltimore, Maryland; and was launched on 28 March 1942.

History
She was allocated to Agwilines Inc., on 5 May 1942. On 10 January 1947, she was sold to for commercial use to France, for $544,506, and renamed Dieppe. In 1954, she was sold and renamed Brother George. In 1964, she was grounded off the Isle of Wight, and scrapped in the Netherlands, the same year.

References

Bibliography

 
 
 
 

 

Liberty ships
Ships built in Baltimore
1942 ships
Liberty ships transferred to France
Ships named for Founding Fathers of the United States